Josh Foley (born 1983) is an Australian artist who won the 2011 Glover Prize.

Early life and education
Foley grew up in Launceston, Tasmania, where he currently lives and works. After he completed his TCE, Foley followed his interest in art and obtained a Bachelor of Contemporary Arts with Honours from the University of Tasmania, graduating in 2004.

Awards, Prizes and Residencies 
Foley was awarded the Glover Prize in 2011; making him the youngest artist, at age 27, to achieve this.

In 2013, he won the Burnie Regional Art Gallery TasART award.

In 2016 Josh undertook a Bundanon Trust residency, at the former property of Australian artist Arthur Boyd and now an artists retreat in NSW. Among his many residencies, in schools and colleges in Tasmania, Foley has also in 2015, undertaken a three-month residency at the Cité internationale des arts in Paris.

Work 
Since graduating from art school in 2004, Foley has led an experimental practice, playing with and developing a number of different painting styles and concepts. More recently, he has begun to focus on what he describes as Parametric Painting, "representing the illusion of a surface through the use of paint." Foley continues to extend the parameters of his painting, through installation, performance and painting directly on the gallery wall.

Public Art 
In addition to his easel based work, Foley has completed a series large scale public art commissions around Tasmania, the most recent of these for Taroona High School, south of Hobart. In 2021 Foley created a large mural at the Launceston Acquatic Centre depicting olympic gold medalist swimmer Ariarne Titmus, for Nike, Inc. one of her sponsors.

References

External links 

1983 births
Living people
Australian artists
People from Launceston, Tasmania
University of Tasmania alumni